Stilbopteryx costalis is a large Australian insect in the antlion family.

References 

Myrmeleontidae
Insects of Australia
Insects described in 1838
Taxa named by Edward Newman